The Garden of Eden is the Biblical garden where Adam and Eve lived.

Garden of Eden may also refer to:

Literature 
 The Garden of Eden (novel), a novel by Ernest Hemingway
 "The Garden of Eden", short story by Rudyard Kipling in Soldiers Three (1888)

Films 
 The Garden of Eden (1928 film), a silent movie
 Garden of Eden (1954 film), a documentary nudist film
 The Garden of Eden (1984 film), a documentary
 The Garden of Eden (1998 film), a drama film
 The Garden of Eden (2008 film), adaptation of the Hemingway novel

Music 
 Garden of Eden (album), a 2006 album by Paul Motian
 Garden of Eden, a 1978 album by Passport
 The Garden of Eden, a 1988 album by a British band of the same name, fronted by Angela McCluskey
 "The Garden of Eden" (song), a 1956 popular song by Dennise Haas Norwood, a hit for Frankie Vaughan among others
 "Garden of Eden" (Guns N' Roses song), 1991
 Garden of Eden, a 2022 song in the EP SZNZ: Spring by Weezer.
 "Garden of Eden", a song by New Riders of the Purple Sage from New Riders of the Purple Sage, 1971
 "Garden of Eden", a song by Ratt from Infestation, 2010

Painting and sculpture 
 The Garden of Eden, painting by Thomas Cole
 Garden of Eden (Lucas, Kansas), a house and concrete sculpture garden in Lucas, Kansas constructed by Samuel P. Dinsmoor, listed on the U.S. National Register of Historic Places

Other uses 
 Garden of Eden, Illinois
 Garden of Eden (cellular automaton), a configuration that cannot be reached from any other configuration
 Garden of Eden (Venice), a villa and garden on the island of Giudecca, Venice, Italy
 Garden of Eden, Nova Scotia, a community in Pictou County, Nova Scotia, Canada
 Garden of Eden, a waterhole in Kings Canyon (Northern Territory), Australia
 Garden of Eden Ice Plateau, a glacier and ice field in New Zealand
Eden Gardens State Park, a state park in Florida, United States
 Eden Gardens, a cricket ground in Kolkata, India
 Eden Garden, a garden in Auckland, New Zealand
 Eden Park, a rugby stadium in Auckland, New Zealand nicknamed Garden of Eden

See also
 Eden (disambiguation)
 The Garden of Earthly Delights, painting by Hieronymus Bosch
 Expulsion from the Garden of Eden, painting by Masaccio
 "In-A-Gadda-Da-Vida", a slurred variant of "In the Garden of Eden"
 "Gates of Eden", a song by Bob Dylan
 Garden of Eatin', snack food produced by Hain Celestial Group